Henry Barraud may refer to:
 Henry Barraud (composer)
 Henry Barraud (artist)